The Men's giant slalom competition of the Nagano 1998 Olympics was held at Mount Yakebitai on 8 February 1998.

It was the first time snowboarding was added as a sport at the Winter Olympic Games. The giant slalom was replaced by the parallel giant slalom event in 2002 in Salt Lake City.

Medalists

Results

The competitors were allowed two runs on a giant slalom course. The two times were then added to determine the winners.
 

DNF - Did not finish; DSQ - Disqualified

References 

Men's giant slalom
Men's events at the 1998 Winter Olympics